Abohill railway station served Abohill in County Fermanagh, Northern Ireland.

The station opened in June 1886. Passenger services were withdrawn on 1 October 1957.

History
The station was on the Sligo, Leitrim and Northern Counties Railway, one of the railways not to be absorbed into the state-owned system in 1925 since it crossed the border between Northern Ireland and the Republic (then the Irish Free State). The Railway was a pioneer in the use of railbuses. The line closed on 1 October 1957 as a direct result of the Government of Northern Ireland ordering closure of the railway line through Enniskillen.

References

Disused railway stations in County Fermanagh
Railway stations opened in 1886
Railway stations closed in 1957
1886 establishments in Ireland
1957 disestablishments in Northern Ireland
Railway stations in Northern Ireland opened in the 19th century